Historical parks in Thailand are managed by the Fine Arts Department, a sub-division of the Ministry of Education. There are currently eleven parks, with four them registered as World Heritage Sites by the UNESCO.

See also 
 List of protected areas of Thailand

References

 
Parks in Thailand
Fine Arts Department (Thailand)